Digital CSIC of Spain is an online open access repository of research produced by the Spanish National Research Council. It began in 2008. The council is the largest public institution dedicated to research in Spain and the third largest in Europe, and produces a large amount of publications and data.

See also
 Open access in Spain
 Science and technology in Spain

References

External links
 Official site
 

Science and technology in Spain
2008 establishments in Spain
Spanish digital libraries
Open-access archives